Rosa Adriana Díaz Lizama (born 16 November 1973) is a Mexican politician affiliated with the PAN. She served as a Senator of the LXII Legislature of the Mexican Congress and as Deputy during the LXI Legislature representing Yucatán, as well as the LVII Legislature of the Congress of Yucatán.

References

1973 births
Living people
Politicians from Yucatán (state)
Women members of the Senate of the Republic (Mexico)
Members of the Senate of the Republic (Mexico)
Members of the Chamber of Deputies (Mexico)
National Action Party (Mexico) politicians
21st-century Mexican politicians
21st-century Mexican women politicians
Women members of the Chamber of Deputies (Mexico)
Universidad Mesoamericana de San Agustín alumni
Anahuac Mayab University alumni
Senators of the LXII and LXIII Legislatures of Mexico
Members of the Congress of Yucatán